Belo Jardim (Beautiful Garden) a Brazilian municipality in the state of Pernambuco. It has an estimated population in 2020 of 76,687 and a total area of 647.7 km².  It is located at 608 meters above the sea level and 182 km away from the state capital, Recife.

The economy is based on agribusiness (poultry, guava-based products, other food), agriculture (beans, maize, sweet potatoes, banana, coffee, manioc, tomatoes, garlic, sugar cane), and automotive batteries.  The city is the headquarters of Acumuladores Moura S.A. (Baterias Moura).

The city is served by Belo Jardim Airport.

Geography

 State - Pernambuco
 Region - Agreste of Pernambuco
 Boundaries - Brejo da Madre de Deus and  Jataúba  (N); São Bento do Una and Sanharó (S); Pesqueira  (W); Tacaimbó  (E)
 Area - 647.7 km2
 Elevation - 608 m
 Hydrography - Ipojuca River
 Vegetation - Subcaducifólia forest
 Climate -  Semi-arid
 Annual average temperature - 22.5 c
 Main road -  BR 232
 Distance to Recife - 182 km

Economy

The economy is based on agribusiness, agriculture, commerce and automotive batteries.  The city is the headquarters of Acumuladores Moura S.A. (Baterias Moura or Auto-batteries Moura).

Economic Indicators

Economy by Sector
2006

Health Indicators

See also
 Belo Jardim City Hall
 Baterias Moura

References

Municipalities in Pernambuco